Santa Caterina Albanese is an Arbëreshë village and comune in the province of Cosenza in the Calabria region of southern Italy.
 
The town is bordered by Fagnano Castello, Malvito, Roggiano Gravina and San Marco Argentano.

People 
 Anton Santori, writer, playwright and poet of the Albanian National Awakening.

References

Arbëresh settlements
Cities and towns in Calabria